Alaei (lit. "excellent") is an Iranian surname which can also be found in the Iranian diaspora. Notable people with the surname include:

 Abolfazl Alaei (born 1994), Iranian football midfielder
 Daniel Alaei (born 1982), American poker player of Assyrian descent
 Hossein Alaei, Iranian retired military officer 
 Shamseddin Amir-Alaei (1900–1994), Iranian politician

References 

Persian-language surnames